Methylobacterium marchantiae  is a facultatively methylotrophic facultative methylotrophy bacteria from the genus of Methylobacterium which has been isolated from the moos Marchantia polymorpha in Bergpark Wilhelmshöhe near Kassel in Germany.

References

Further reading

External links
Type strain of Methylobacterium marchantiae at BacDive -  the Bacterial Diversity Metadatabase

Hyphomicrobiales
Bacteria described in 2011